Rabbi Dr. Harvey Belovski (born 18 January 1968), is a British Orthodox rabbi, educator and organisational advisor. He has been the rabbi of Golders Green United Synagogue since 2003, a position previously held by Chief Rabbi Lord Sacks.
Belovski was widely reported as a leading candidate for the Chief Rabbinate of the UK  in the 2012 selection process which eventually appointed Rabbi Ephraim Mirvis.In October 2022, Rabbi Belovski announced his intention to step down from his position at the Golders Green Synagouge, and focus on his other activities. He will step down at the end of 2023 after 20 years at the helm.

Background and education
Belovski grew up in north-west London and graduated in 1989 from University College, Oxford in Mathematics. He studied at the Gateshead Talmudical College, from where he received semicha (rabbinic ordination) in 1994 and subsequently at the Gateshead Beis Hatalmud Kollel. He received further semicha-ordinations from the Amsterdam Beth Din and Dayan Gershon Lopian, emeritus rabbi of Edgware Yeshurun Synagogue, whom he considers his primary teacher. He also holds a PhD in hermeneutics from the University of London.

Belovski has published two books – Shem MiShmuel: Selections on the Weekly Parashah and Festivals,  and The Shabbat Siddur Companion, as well as an online version of his PhD dissertation –Harmonisation as Theological Hermeneutic and many articles in  The Jewish Chronicle among other journals.

Current advisory and teaching roles
 Principal and Governor of Rimon Jewish Primary School  
 CEO of University Jewish Chaplaincy 
 Research and Teaching Fellow at the London School of Jewish Studies
 Rabbi of Kisharon 
 Rosh (Rabbinic Head) of The Midrasha for Women 
 Rabbinic Advisor of PaL (Phone and Learn)
 Faculty Member at the Montefiore College Semicha course 
 Lecturer at the JLE (Jewish Learning Exchange)
 Member of the Rabbinical Council of the United Synagogue 
 Member of the Advisory Council at the London School of Jewish Studies 
 Member of the President’s Forum at Jewish Care

External links
 Belovski – A View with a Room
 Golders Green Synagogue

References

1968 births
Living people
Alumni of University College, Oxford
Alumni of the University of London
British Orthodox rabbis
Modern Orthodox rabbis
Rabbis from London